Adam Phelan (born 23 August 1991) is an Australian former professional racing cyclist, who rode professionally between 2011 and 2016. He is now a media and marketing professional.

References

External links

1991 births
Living people
Australian male cyclists
Sportspeople from Canberra
Cyclists from the Australian Capital Territory